The men's 1500 metres in speed skating at the 1976 Winter Olympics took place on 13 February, at the Eisschnellaufbahn.

Records
Prior to this competition, the existing world and Olympic records were as follows:

The following new world and olympic records was set during the competition.

Results

References

Men's speed skating at the 1976 Winter Olympics